Klaus Daweke (May 14, 1943 – March 28, 2020) was a German politician of the Christian Democratic Union (CDU) and former member of the German Bundestag.

Life 
Daweke had been a member of the CDU since 1964. He was chairman of the CDU district association of Lippe from 1977 to 1991 and chairman of the CDU district association of Westphalia-Lippe from 1981 to 1987. He was a member of the German Bundestag from 1976 to 1990. From 1983 to 1987, he represented the constituency of Lippe I in parliament, and in 1976 and 1987, he entered the Bundestag via the state list of the CDU North Rhine-Westphalia. Daweke was a member of the Committee for Education and Science in all election periods.

Literature

References

1943 births
2020 deaths
Members of the Bundestag for North Rhine-Westphalia
Members of the Bundestag 1987–1990
Members of the Bundestag 1983–1987
Members of the Bundestag 1980–1983
Members of the Bundestag 1976–1980
Members of the Bundestag for the Christian Democratic Union of Germany